Lukasiak is a surname. Notable people with the surname include:

Agnieszka Lukasiak (born 1977), Polish-born film director
Chloe Lukasiak (born 2001), American actress, dancer, author, television personality, and model
Oskar Lukasiak (born 1991), Swedish darts player

See also
Łukasik